
Bełchatów County is a unit of territorial administration and local government (powiat) in Łódź Voivodeship, central Poland. It came into being on January 1, 1999, as a result of the Polish local government reforms passed in 1998.

As of 2006 its total population is 112,640, out of which the population of Bełchatów is 62,062, that of Zelów is 8,173, and the rural population is 42,405.

Neighbouring counties
Bełchatów County is bordered by Pabianice County to the north, Piotrków County to the east, Radomsko County to the south, Pajęczno County to the south-west, Wieluń County to the west and Łask County to the north-west.

Administrative division
The county is subdivided into eight gminas (one urban, one urban-rural and six rural). These are listed in the following table, in descending order of population.

References
Polish official population figures 2006

 
Land counties of Łódź Voivodeship